Antonio Wade Campbell (born November 29, 1965) is an American educator and politician. He ran unsuccessfully as the Republican Party nominee in the 2018 for the United States Senate, losing to incumbent Democrat Ben Cardin.

Campbell teaches political science at Towson University, following a career as a chaplain in the US Army.

Background

Education
Campbell is a native of Chippewa Township, Pennsylvania, where he graduated from Blackhawk High School in 1983. He studied at the University of Pittsburgh, graduating in 2003 with a Bachelor of Arts degree in Political Science. He then received a Master of Science degree in Social Science at Towson University in 2007. At Liberty University, he earned Master of Divinity (M.Div.) and Doctor of Ministry (D.Min.) degrees. His doctoral dissertation in 2016, Every Life Matters to God: A New Paradigm of Care for Suicide Prevention, addressed methodologies and best practices in care to reduce the high suicide rate among National Guard soldiers returning from overseas deployments in combat zones. After obtaining his master's degree in 2007, Campbell became a Chaplain in the U.S. Army.

In politics

Campbell described himself as a "conservative Democrat" while living in Pennsylvania, but switched parties to Republican when he moved to Maryland, saying he found the Democratic party "too liberal" in Maryland. In 1999, he ran unsuccessfully as a Republican for Baltimore City Council President against Democrat Sheila Dixon.

Although Campbell served in the administration of President George W. Bush, he was a contributing writer on a blog called "Republicans for Obama" in 2008. He defended his controversial stance on the nationally syndicated The Laura Ingraham Show. 

Campbell teaches political science at Towson University. As a professor of political science, he appeared on television as a governmental affairs commentator. On January 23, 2017, for example, he gave an analysis of President Trump's Inaugural Address to WMAR-TV, the ABC affiliate in Baltimore.

Campbell has taken a leading role in Baltimore's Black Republican Council. In 2016, he hosted a free-wheeling forum for African-American politicians,‎ “2016 Baltimore: A Colloquy on Conservative Solutions to Problems Besetting Inner-City Baltimore". Issues of concern to the city's majority-minority African-American population, such as illegal immigration and crime, were discussed.

A resident of Baltimore County, Maryland, he has been active on the Executive Committee of the Maryland Republican Party, also serving on Baltimore County's Charter Review Commission. Campbell previously ran  for Baltimore County Executive in 2014, losing narrowly in the Republican primary. He currently serves on the Baltimore County School Board Nomination Commission.

2018 U.S. Senate campaign

In the Republican primary held on June 26, 2018, Campbell won with 29.2% of the vote in a crowded field of 11 candidates, carrying 13 of Maryland's 23 counties and Baltimore City.

Campbell's campaign in the general election stressed national security and smaller government, saying his priority as Senator would be "securing America' infrastructure against foreign actors". On education, he called for an end to such programs as Common Core, advocating a "return of authority" over schools from the Federal government to the state level. He also campaigned for "reasonable tuition rates to allow for every student to achieve their goal of a four year college degree". In an interview with the Hagerstown Herald-Mail newspaper, Campbell said he advocates a balanced budget amendment to the Constitution to curb Federal government deficit spending, although he generally supports the Trump administration's positions on the economy and foreign policy.

In an October 7, 2018, televised debate described by the Washington Post as "feisty", Campbell criticized his Democratic Party opponent, incumbent Ben Cardin, who won a third term, saying the incumbent should have done more about Baltimore's high crime rate and poorly performing schools. In response, Cardin replied that these are primarily responsibilities of local government. Campbell also said that Cardin was part of the partisanship in the Senate and criticized his opponent for voting against the confirmation of US Supreme Court nominee Brett Kavanaugh. Cardin said that he has "worked across the aisle" on bipartisan issues, such as environmental concerns over the Chesapeake Bay. When questioned about the likelihood of success in challenging the heavily-favored, long-term Democratic incumbent in the strongly blue state of Maryland, Campbell said that Republican Gov. Larry Hogan's success at the polls in the 2014 gubernatorial election "...tells me people are ready for change. The incumbent has been in Congress for 32 years and there’s not much to show for it”, Campbell charged.

On October 18, he made a joint appearance with Democratic gubernatorial candidate Ben Jealous on OZY's televised Take on America show hosted by Carlos Watson to discuss the topic, "Black Men in Baltimore”.  The program focused on solutions to the challenges facing many inner-city African-American residents, in particular poverty, crime, and drugs.

In a CNN interview aired on October 23, Sen. Cardin called on the US government to furnish humanitarian aid for a caravan of several thousand Central American migrants heading to the US border through Mexico, describing their situation as  "desperate" and saying, "America's strength is in our values. We have been a leader standing up for people at risk". Campbell strongly disagreed with Cardin over providing help to them, posting on social media that the "illegal immigrant caravan ... seeks to undermine our country's sovereignty by bum-rushing our border".

Campbell lost in the general election held on November 7, 2018, receiving 31% or 659,380 votes to Cardin's 64% (1,363,259 votes).
Had he won he would have become Maryland's first African-American Senator.

Author
Campbell has authored two non-fiction books. He wrote America Today: Political Theory and Practical Politics in 2014, an anthology relating the thoughts of political theorists as far back as Plato to contemporary American politics. It is a textbook intended for use in political science, pre-law, and history courses.

His second book, A More Perfect Union: Connecting the Dots Between Today's Politics and the History of Political Thought, was written in 2017. With its title drawn from the  Preamble to the United States Constitution, A More Perfect Union discusses the Constitution's application to political discourse and policy making in the modern era.

References

External links
 Campbell for Senate 2018 Campaign
 C-SPAN debate
 On the Hill interview, WTTG-TV, Washington, DC

1960s births
21st-century American politicians
African-American Christians
African-American people in Maryland politics
Candidates in the 2018 United States Senate elections
Liberty University alumni
Living people
Maryland Republicans
People from Baltimore County, Maryland
Politicians from Baltimore
Towson University alumni
University of Pittsburgh alumni